Area code 807 is a telephone area code in the North American Numbering Plan (NANP) for the Canadian province of Ontario. The numbering plan area (NPA), comprising only Northwestern Ontario, was created in early 1962 in an area code split of NPA 705. The main reason for the split was not central office prefix exhaustion, but routing efficiency for calls from Western Canada to northwestern Ontario.

Major communities served by  area code 807 include Thunder Bay, Kenora, Dryden, Fort Frances, Rainy River, Marathon, and Greenstone. The area is split between the Central and Eastern Time Zones.

The incumbent local exchange carriers in the numbering plan area are Tbaytel, Bell Canada, and Bell Aliant's Dryden Municipal Telephone Service.

The numbering plan area is one of the least populated in Canada. Fewer than 40% of its telephone numbers are in use and the Canadian Numbering Administration Consortium (CNAC) estimates that it will not be exhausted for many decades. In the turn of the 3rd millennium, as area code 705 neared exhaustion, the CNAC briefly considered "erasing" the 807-705 boundary and turning 807 into an overlay for all of Ontario north and west of the Golden Horseshoe. However, the potential for confusion prevented that solution from being ultimately implemented. As a result, 807 is the only area code in Ontario without an overlay and hence the only one that still allows 7-digit dialing. Other such Canadian area codes are 506, 709, and 867. Although Northwestern Ontario should not need an additional area code anytime soon, 10-digit dialing may still need to be implemented in the area in the near future. That prospect became more likely in August 2022 when the Canadian Radio-television and Telecommunications Commission ordered a transition to the three-digit code 9-8-8 for suicide prevention resources. 
Despite the fact that 988 is not in use as a local exchange in area code 807, the CRTC has ordered 10-digit local calling to be implemented by 31 May 2023. The CRTC's decision followed the decision of the US Federal Communications Commission to adopt 9-8-8 as the number for the US National Suicide Prevention Lifeline.

Communities and central office prefixes
Armstrong (807) 583
Atikokan (807) 324, 590, 594, 596, 597, 598, 770
Balmertown - See Red Lake
Barwick (807) 487
Beardmore (807) 875
Bearskin Lake (807) 363
Big Trout Lake (807) 537
Caramat (807) 872
Cat Lake (807) 347
Clearwater Bay (807) 733
Cloud Bay (807) 964
Cochenour (807) 662
Deer Lake (807) 775
Devlin (807) 486
Dorion (807) 857
Dryden (807) 212, 216, 217, 220, 221, 223, 323, 995
Eagle River (807) 755
Ear Falls (807) 222
Emo (807) 482
Flanders (807) 947
Fort Frances (807) 270, 271, 272, 274, 275, 276, 788, 789, 861, 994
Fort Hope (807) 242
Fort Severn (807) 478
Geraldton (807) 790, 853, 854, 855, 863
Grassy Narrows (807) 925
Gull Bay First Nation (807) 982
Hemlo (807) 238
Hornepayne (807) 379, 868
Hudson (807) 582
Ignace (807) 747, 934, 936
Jellicoe (807) 879
Kaministiquia (807) 933
Kasabonika (807) 535
Kenora (807) 219, 407, 444, 456, 463, 464, 465, 466, 467, 468, 547, 548
Kingfisher Lake (807) 532
Lac La Croix First Nation (807) 485
Lansdowne House (807) 479
Longlac (807) 876
Macdiarmid (807) 885
Madsen - See Red Lake
Manitouwadge (807) 378 826
Marathon (807) 228, 229, 230, 231, 371, 787
McKenzie Island - See Red Lake
McKenzie Portage (807) 543
Morson (807) 488
Muskrat Dam (807) 471
Minaki (807) 224
Mine Centre (807) 599
Nakina (807) 329
Nestor Falls (807) 484
Nibinamik First Nation (Summer Beaver) (807) 593
Nicikousemenecaning First Nation (Bears Passage) (807) 481
Nipigon (807) 372, 880, 887, 888, 889
Ogoki (807) 349
Oxdrift (807) 937
Pass Lake (807) 977
Perrault Falls (807) 529
Pickle Lake (807) 928
Pikangikum (807) 773
Poplar Hill (807) 772
Rainy River (807) 275, 276, 360, 852
Raith (807) 448
Red Rock (807) 886
Red Lake (807) 726, 727, 728, 729, 735, 749
Redditt (807) 225
Sachigo Lake First Nation (807) 595
Sandy Lake (807) 771, 774, 776
Sapawe (807) 929
Savant Lake (807) 584
Schreiber (807) 373, 824, 825
Shebandowan (807) 926
Sioux Lookout (807) 214, 374, 737, 738
Sioux Narrows (807) 226, 232
Starratt Olsen - See Red Lake
Stratton (807) 483
Terrace Bay (807) 375, 821, 823, 825
Thunder Bay (807) 251, 252, 285, 286, 333, 343, 344, 345, 346, 355, 356, 357, 472, 473, 474, 475, 476, 577, 619, 620, 621, 622, 623, 624, 625, 626, 627, 628, 629, 630, 631, 632, 633, 683, 684, 700, 701, 707, 708, 709, 766, 767, 768, 777, 867, 935, 939, 957, 983, 999
Upsala (807) 985, 986
Vermilion Bay (807) 227
Wabaseemoong Independent Nations (White Dog) (807) 927
Wabigoon First Nation (807) 938 943
Weagamow First Nation (807) 469
Webequie First Nation (807) 353
White River (807) 822
Wunnumin Lake First Nation (807) 442

See also
List of NANP area codes

References

External links
CNA exchange list for area +1-807
Telecom archives

807
Communications in Ontario